Seymour Tower is a coastal defence tower built on a rocky tidal island called L'Avarison, located 2 km (1.25 miles) east of the shoreline of Jersey, an area included in Jersey's South-East coast Ramsar site. Acquired by Jersey Heritage in 2006, it has since been used for  self-catering accommodation.

History
The tower was constructed in 1782 following the Battle of Jersey (6 January 1781), and is one of thirty coastal towers that Conway planned to build in the Channel Island. Only 23 towers were built, and Seymour is the only one that is square-shaped rather than round. A 1860 memorandum from Colonel Le Couter declared that Seymour Tower and Icho Tower to south were to be abandoned. 

After a long period of vacancy, the States of Jersey purchased the tower in 1923 for £120 and it was subsequently released to private tenants. Jersey Heritage acquired the tower in 2006 and uses it for self-catering accommodation. In 2012 the tower and surrounding area featured in "The Riddle of the Tides", an episode of the BBC documentary Coast. 

The team of archaeologists, led by Dr Matthew Pope of UCL's Institute of Archaeology, in collaboration with Jersey Heritage, began to document more evidence of Neanderthal activity in this landscape. This work complements research carried out at La Cotte de St Brelade, on the south-west coast of Jersey which showed that Neanderthals had lived there between 250,000 and 50,000 years ago.

See also

Coastal fortifications of Jersey

References

External links

Seymour Tower
BBC Radio Inside Science: Low-Tide Archaeology 

Fortifications in Jersey
Coastal fortifications
Towers in Jersey
Towers completed in 1782
1782 establishments in the British Empire